Gospel JA FM (91.7 & 91.9 MHz) is a Jamaican commercial FM gospel radio station. It is owned and operated by KC Broadcasting Company Limited. Gospel JA fm operates in Jamaica on 91.7 and 91.9 on the FM band. Gospel JA fm has its offices and studios at 10 Collins Green Avenue, Kingston 5, Jamaica. The CEO/Managing Director of Gospel JA fm is Wyatt K. C. Davis. Gospel JA FM plays 80% Jamaican gospel music.

Radio Announcers
 Wyatt K. C. Davis (The Gospel Mix)
 Kevin Lewis (Arise JA)
 Ava-Gay Blair (The Gospel Light)
 Markland Edwards (The Overflow)
 Neison Williams (The Gospel Beat)
 Markland Edwards (The Spotlight)
 Trishauna Hemmings-Wilks (The Gospel Rock)
 Anya-Jean Phillips (Heart of Gold; The Sunday Glaze)
 Kevin Lewis (The Gospel Sun)

References

External links

Radio stations in Jamaica
Radio stations established in 2012